Jerrinja is the name of an Aboriginal Australian people from the South Coast of New South Wales, Australia. Their traditional lands cover from Crooked River in the north to Clyde River in the south, from the coast (Roseby Park) in the east to the mountains in the west (Braidwood, New South Wales). It includes the areas of Shoalhaven which include Jervis Bay, Culburra Beach, Orient Point, Greenwell Point and Shoalhaven Heads.

History
Contemporary Jerrinja descend from those peoples who gathered or were gathered into the Roseby Park Aboriginal Reserve around the early 1900s.

In 1983, following on from the provisions of the recent NSW Aboriginal Land Rights Act 1983, ownership of the Roseby Park was transferred to the Jerrinja Local Aboriginal Land Council.

Many Jerrinja people have been strongly involved in the Aboriginal Land Rights struggles for more than fifty years. The former NSW Aboriginal "mission" Roseby Park at Orient Point was renamed Jerrinja Aboriginal Community and is located within the central-east of their country. Jerrinja are a coastal "salt-water" peoples who have maintained a strong connection with their country.

Some of the culturally significant places within their country include Mount Coolangatta (Cullunghutti), Lake Wollumboola and Beecroft Peninsula.

Notes

Citations

Sources

Aboriginal peoples of New South Wales
South Coast (New South Wales)